Willy von Beckerath (28 September 1868 – 10 May 1938) was a German painter and art professor associated with the Düsseldorfer Malerschule. He was primarily known for portraits, landscapes and murals. From 1902, he was instrumental in the formation of the Deutsche Werkstätten Hellerau. He designed furniture and furnishings for churches. From 1907 to 1931, he was professor at the Staatliche Kunstgewerbeschule in Hamburg (now University of Fine Arts of Hamburg), where he decorated a new assembly hall with a monumental mural over three of its walls,  (The Eternal Wave).

Life and work 
Von Beckerath was born in Krefeld. His family was involved in the textile industry. They were friends of Johannes Brahms, and Von Beckerath painted  several portraits of the composer.

Von Beckerath studied at the Kunstakademie Düsseldorf from 1885 to 1895, with Heinrich Lauenstein, Hugo Crola, Adolf Schill and Peter Janssen. Following his graduation, he went to Munich. He initially focused on religious art, but soon turned to mythological themes, influenced by Max Klinger.

Von Beckerath made a charcoal drawing of Brahms at the piano with crossed hand in 1896, and a tempura painting of the motif in 1911. Brahms would often play his Rhapsody in G minor which features crossed hands.

He married Luise Schultz (1872–1958), a pianist, in 1899. They had two sons,  who became a cellist with the Munich Philharmonic, and Rudolf who became a master organ builder.

Von Beckerath designed furniture and also furnishings for churches such as pews, confessionals, baptismal fonts, holy water basins and small sculptures. To optimise production, a company town named Hellerau was created outside of Dresden. It was conceived as a Catholic-social reform quarter.

Around the same time, the sculpture hall at the Kunsthalle Bremen was redesigned by the architects  and Eduard Runge (?-1944) with decorative wall panels by the stage designer . Murals for the panels were provided by Von Beckerath, after whom the hall was ultimately named. His mural in three parts depicts naked persons in a landscape, who pick fruits, make music, play or bathe. The colours are light and cool, to represent enjoyment and rest.

Inspired by the reform movement, he tried to close the gap between "high" art and "low" applied art. A new school building, designed by Fritz Schumacher, was opened in 1913. From then until 1918, Beckerath worked on a large eight-part wall mural to decorate the Aula assembly hall. Titled  (The Eternal Wave), it depicts the rise and fall of a human cultural era, rising and falling, in eight parts. The artwork forms a bond of architecture and painting, with the canvas mount in the wall. Considered to be his magnum opus, it was dedicated with a speech by the art historian and cultural theorist, Aby Warburg. Die ewige Welle was covered with monochrome plaster in the 1950s, but the whole Aula was restored over five years to its original appearance, for the centenary in 2013.

They could not be installed immediately, and after the Nazis assumed power in 1933, their style was no longer welcome.

Von Beckerath died in Irschenhausen at age 69.

References

Further reading 
 Beckerath, Willy von, In: Allgemeines Lexikon der Bildenden Künstler von der Antike bis zur Gegenwart, Vol. 3: Bassano–Bickham, Wilhelm Engelmann, Leipzig 1909
 Gartenstadt Hellerau, Der Alltag einer Utopie. Dresdner Geschichtsverein, Michel Sandstein Grafischer Betrieb und Verlagsgesellschaft, Dresden 1997,

External links 

 Willy von Beckerath (artworks, in German) artnet.de
 Willy von Beckerath: Joseph Joachim (Munich, 1902) josephjoachim.com 2019

1868 births
1938 deaths
19th-century German painters
19th-century German male artists
German muralists
Kunstakademie Düsseldorf alumni
Academic staff of the University of Fine Arts of Hamburg
People from Krefeld
20th-century German painters
20th-century German male artists